The Friedrichshafen FF.17 was an experimental floatplane built in Germany in 1914. Originally designed and flown with a single main float and two outriggers as the FF.17, it was later modified as the FF.17b with two floats.

Specifications (FF.17)

References

Bibliography

Friedrichshafen aircraft
Floatplanes